Araz Gol (also Romanized as Arāz Gol) is a village in Fenderesk-e Shomali Rural District, Fenderesk District, Ramian County, Golestan Province, Iran. At the 2006 census, its population was 1,601, in 376 families.

References 

Populated places in Ramian County